The Anglican Church of St Nicholas in Corfe, Somerset, England was built in the Norman period and rebuilt in 1842. It is a Grade II* listed building.

History

The Church of St Nicholas is a 1842 rebuilding, by Benjamin Ferrey of a Norman church on the same site. The chancel arch and nave arcade are neo-Romanesque and, along with two corbels, have survived from the design of the original building.

The south aisle was added and tower rebuilt in 1858 by Charles Edmund Giles. Stained glass by James Powell and Sons was installed in the 1850s.

In 1969 the chancel was further restored.

The parish is part of the Blackdown benefice within the Diocese of Bath and Wells.

Architecture

The church is built of Blue Lias with stone dressing and a slate roof. It has a four-bay nave, a south aisle and a chancel. The three-stage tower has a pyramidal roof.

Inside the church the Norman white stone font survives.

The churchyard includes an unidentified chest tomb from around 1860, and one for the Brown family from the late 18th century.

See also  
 List of ecclesiastical parishes in the Diocese of Bath and Wells

References

Grade II* listed buildings in Taunton Deane
Grade II* listed churches in Somerset